Cape Waite is a cape at the northwest extremity of King Peninsula, marking the southwest side of the entrance to Peacock Sound. Delineated from air photos taken by U.S. Navy Operation HIGHJUMP in December 1946. Named by the Advisory Committee on Antarctic Names for Amory H. Waite, member of the Byrd Antarctic Expedition, 1933–35, and communications specialist on the Atka voyage of 1955 and the U.S. Navy Bellingshausen Sea Expedition of 1959–60. Waite was investigating the high number of aircraft crashes in Antarctica when he discovered that certain radar frequencies were not reflected from the surface of the ice, they penetrated through to the land surface below, giving false altimeter readings.  This discovery both made flight much safer and started the use of radioglaciology to survey the topography of the land surface beneath the ice.

References

Headlands of Ellsworth Land